John Joseph Gray (December 24, 1894 – June 12, 1942) was an American long-distance runner. He competed in the men's 10,000 metres at the 1924 Summer Olympics.

References

External links
 

1894 births
1942 deaths
Athletes (track and field) at the 1924 Summer Olympics
American male long-distance runners
Olympic track and field athletes of the United States
Place of birth missing
Olympic cross country runners
20th-century American people